Major John Mackenzie, VC, DCM (22 November 1871 – 17 May 1915) was a Scottish recipient of the Victoria Cross, the highest and most prestigious award for gallantry in the face of the enemy that can be awarded to British and Commonwealth forces.

Details
Mackenzie was 29 years old, and a sergeant in the 2nd Battalion, The Seaforth Highlanders (Ross-shire Buffs, Duke of Albany's), British Army, employed West African Field Force during the Third Ashanti Expedition when the following deed took place for which he was awarded the VC.

On 6 June 1900 at Dompoassi, Ashanti (now Ghana), Sergeant Mackenzie, after working two Maxim guns under heavy fire and being wounded while doing so, volunteered to clear the stockade of the enemy. This he did, most gallantly, leading the charge himself and driving the enemy headlong into the bush.

Further information
John Mackenzie was commissioned as a second lieutenant in the Black Watch on 29 November 1900 and became a captain in the Royal Scots on 22 January 1904. During this time he also served on attachment with the Northern Nigeria Regiment. He was mentioned in dispatches for his work during the Aro Expedition (November 1901 to March 1902); also in 1906 when he was staff officer of the Munster Field Force and once more during the Kano-Sokoto Expedition.

He was promoted to major during World War I and was commanding officer of the 2nd Battalion of the Bedfordshire Regiment, where at Festubert on 17 May 1915, when leading his men, he was killed just after he had left the jumping off trench.

Major Mackenzie is buried in the Guards Cemetery, Windy Corner, Cuinchy, in Northern France.

His Victoria Cross is displayed at the Regimental Museum of Queens Own Highlanders, Fort George, Inverness-shire, Scotland. His pipe banner is located in the Royal Scots Museum at Edinburgh Castle.

References

 Monuments to Courage (David Harvey, 1999)
 The Register of the Victoria Cross (This England, 1997)
 Scotland's Forgotten Valour (Graham Ross, 1995)

External links
 Profile with photograph

1871 births
1915 deaths
People from Ross and Cromarty
British recipients of the Victoria Cross
Recipients of the Distinguished Conduct Medal
Seaforth Highlanders soldiers
Black Watch officers
Royal Scots officers
Royal West African Frontier Force officers
British Army personnel of World War I
British military personnel killed in World War I
British military personnel of the War of the Golden Stool
British military personnel of the Chitral Expedition
Bedfordshire and Hertfordshire Regiment officers
British military personnel of the Kano-Sokoto Expedition
British Army recipients of the Victoria Cross
British expatriates in Nigeria
Scottish military personnel
People from colonial Nigeria
British Army